The following tables show state-by-state results in the Australian Senate at the 2007 federal election, 37 Coalition (32 Liberal, four National, one CLP), 32 Labor, five Green, one Family First, and one independent, Nick Xenophon. Senators are elected for six-year terms, and took their seats from 1 July 2008, but senators representing the territories have three-year terms and take their seats immediately.

Preference deals
Preferences played a crucial role in determining winners in both the House and Senate. Unlike the previous election, Labor and Australian Democrats directed preferences to the Australian Greens. In exchange, the Greens preferenced the Democrats and Labor. The Family First Party and Christian Democratic Party (Australia) directed preferences in most states to the Coalition. In turn, the Coalition preferenced both parties and also preferenced the Greens ahead of Labor.

Australia

New South Wales

Both major parties finished with around 40% of the primary vote each with Labor in front. The Greens received over 8% of the primary vote. Labor won two seats on primary vote alone, narrowly missing a third seat. The Coalition also won two seats, including one to National Party of Australia candidate John Williams. Despite finishing with less than 1% of the primary vote, the Climate Change Coalition managed to place ahead of Pauline's United Australia Party, the Democrats and Family First. The Democrats and Pauline United Australia Party directed preferences to the Climate Change Coalition. Unlike in other states, Family First also directed its preferences to the Climate Change Coalition. After these preferences, the Climate Change Coalition had increased their vote from less than 1% to almost 5%. However, they still narrowly finished behind the Christian Democrats. Preferences from the Climate Change Coalition went to the Greens however they still finished behind the major parties. This led to Greens senator Kerry Nettle losing her seat. Preferences from the Christian Democrats went to the Coalition, allowing them to win their third seat with Labor winning the remaining seat. The end result was three seats each to the Coalition and Labor

Victoria

Labor once again narrowly finished ahead of the Coalition on primary votes with around 40% each. Both parties won two seats each on primary vote alone, with another two seats yet to be won. The Greens finished with just over 10% of the vote. After preferences from small minor parties, Labor managed to stay ahead of the Greens and Coalition. Preferences from the Democrats allowed the Greens to go ahead of the Coalition and close to the required number of votes to win a seat. However, preferences from Family First allowed the Coalition to win a third seat whilst Labor narrowly won the remaining seat over the Greens. The end result was three seats each to the Coalition and Labor

Queensland

The Coalition narrowly finished ahead of Labor on primary vote with around 40% each. The Greens finished with over 7% and Pauline's United Australia party with over 4%. The Coalition and Labor both won 2 seats each on primary vote alone. Preferences from the Democrats allowed the Greens to narrowly go ahead of Labor. Family first preferences were enough for Nationals candidate Ron Boswell to be re-elected and win a third seat for the Coalition. Pauline's United Australia party directed preferences to Labor which allowed them to win the final seat. The final result was three seats each to Labor and the Coalition.

Western Australia

Unlike in other states, the Liberal Party of Australia and Nationals were not on a joint ticket. However, the Liberals finished far ahead of Labor in the primary vote with a 10% margin between them. The Greens finished with over 9% of the vote. The Liberals won three seats on primary vote alone whilst Labor won two. After these seats were distributed, the Greens were ahead of all parties. The Democratic Labor Party distributed preferences to the Christian Democrats, allowing them to go ahead of the Liberal party. Preferences from the Liberal Party allowed the Christian Democrats to go ahead of Labor and narrowly behind the Greens. However, preferences from Labor led to Greens candidate Scott Ludlam winning the final seat. The end result was three seats to the Liberals, two to Labor and one to the Greens

South Australia

Both major parties finished with around 35% each, with Independent Nick Xenophon at almost 15% followed by the Greens on over 6%. The Liberals and Labor won two seats each whilst Xenophon won a seat on primary vote alone. Preferences from the What Women Want (Australia) Party and the Climate Change Coalition allowed the Greens to go ahead of all parties. This was followed by preferences from the Democratic Labor Party and Family First going to the Liberals, which allowed the Coalition to go ahead of the Greens. However, the Greens managed to crucially stay ahead of Labor, which led to preferences from Labor going to the Greens. This was enough for Greens candidate Sarah Hanson-Young winning the remaining seat. The final result was two seats to the Liberals, two seats to Labor, one seat to Xenophon and one seat to the Greens

Tasmania

Labor finished ahead of the Liberals with around 40% of the vote each, followed by the Greens with over 18%. Labor and the Liberals each won two seats on primary vote alone whilst the Greens won one on primary vote. Preferences from the Greens led to Labor winning the remaining seat. The final result was three seats to Labor, two seats to the Liberals and one seat to the Greens.

Territories

Australian Capital Territory

Northern Territory

See also
Members of the Australian Senate, 2008–2011
Results of the 2007 Australian federal election (House of Representatives)

Notes

References

External links
Group voting ticket preference flows

2007 elections in Australia
Senate 2007
Australian Senate elections